Aleksei Vasilyevich Buznyakov (born 13 February 1985) is a Russian former professional football player.

Club career
He played in the Russian Football National League for FC Metallurg Krasnoyarsk in 2006.

External links
 

1985 births
Sportspeople from Rostov-on-Don
Living people
Russian footballers
Association football midfielders
FC Rotor Volgograd players
FC Yenisey Krasnoyarsk players
FC SKA Rostov-on-Don players
FC Tyumen players
FC Smena Komsomolsk-na-Amure players